Thomas A. Renda (born September 19, 1937) was an American politician in the state of Iowa.

Renda was born in Des Moines, Iowa. He attended Drake University and Loras College and is a lawyer and judge. He served in the Iowa House of Representatives from 1965 to 1971 as a Democrat.

References

1937 births
Living people
Politicians from Des Moines, Iowa
Loras College alumni
Iowa state court judges
Democratic Party members of the Iowa House of Representatives
Drake University Law School alumni